The Dominican Restoration War or the Dominican War of Restoration was a guerrilla war between 1863 and 1865 in the Dominican Republic between nationalists and Spain, who had recolonized the country 17 years after its independence. The war resulted in the restoration of Dominican sovereignty, the withdrawal of Spanish forces, the separation of the Captaincy General of Santo Domingo from Spain, and the establishment of a second republic in the Dominican Republic.

Background 

General Pedro Santana had wrested the presidency from Buenaventura Báez, who had bankrupted the nation's treasury at great profit to himself. Faced with an economic crisis as well as the possibility of renewed attack from Haiti, Santana asked Spain to retake control of the country, after a period of only 17 years of independence. Spain was wary at first, but with the U.S. occupied with its own civil war and unable to enforce the Monroe Doctrine, it felt it had an opportunity to reassert control in Latin America. On March 18, 1861, the annexation was announced, and Santana became Governor-General of the newly created province.

However, this act was not well received by everyone. On May 2, General José Contreras led a failed rebellion, and Francisco del Rosario Sánchez led an invasion from Haiti (who were officially neutral, but also concerned about Spain flexing its muscles in the area), but he was captured and executed on July 4, 1861. Santana himself did not fare well under the new regime. He discovered that he was unable to wield the same amount of power under Spanish rule as he could as president of an independent nation, and resigned his post in January 1862.

Spanish officials began to alienate the general population by instituting a policy known as bagajes, which required citizens to hand over any work animals to the Spanish military upon demand without any guarantee of compensation. This was especially problematic in the Cibao region in the north, where farmers depended on their animals for their livelihoods. A second factor was cultural: the new archbishop from Spain was appalled to find that a large number of Dominican couples were not married within the Catholic Church. This situation had come about due to a small number of priests in the country, as well as poverty and the lack of roads and transportation to get to a church for marriage. With the best of intentions, Archbishop Bienvenido de Monzón wanted to rectify this situation within a short time, but his demands only irritated the local population, who had come to accept the current state of illegitimate births as normal.

Economically, the new government also imposed higher tariffs on non-Spanish goods and ships and attempted to establish a monopoly on tobacco, thus alienating the merchant classes as well. By late 1862, Spanish officials were beginning to fear the possibility of rebellion in the Cibao region (anti-Spanish feelings were not as strong in the south). Lastly, despite explicit statements to the contrary, rumors spread that Spain would re-institute slavery and ship black Dominicans to Cuba and Puerto Rico.

Meanwhile, Spain had issued a royal order in January 1862 declaring its intent to regain the territories that Toussaint Louverture had taken for Haiti in 1794. In attempting to quell disturbances in Santo Domingo, Spanish troops had evicted Haitians living in these areas along the Haitian–Dominican border. Haitian president Fabre Geffrard gave up his position of neutrality and began to aid the Dominican rebels.

War 

On August 16, 1863, a new group under the leadership of Santiago Rodríguez made a daring raid on Capotillo near Dajabón and raised the new Dominican flag on the Capotillo hill. This action, known as El grito de Capotillo, was the beginning of the war.

Town after town in Cibao joined the rebellion, and on September 3, a force of 6,000 Dominicans besieged Fort San Luis and its 800 Spanish soldiers in Santiago. Spanish reinforcements marched from Puerto Plata to relieve the besieged garrison, defeating the rebels under the command of Gaspar Polanco and Gregorio Luperon. The rebels later burned the town and besieged the fort again. On September 14, the Spaniards abandoned Santiago and made their way to Puerto Plata harassed by guerrilla attacks that inflicted 1,300 casualties.

The rebels established a new government the following day, with José Antonio Salcedo as self-appointed president, and immediately denounced Santana, who was now leading the Spanish forces, as a traitor. Salcedo attempted to engage the U.S. for assistance, but was rebuffed. 

Spain had a difficult time fighting the rebels. Over the course of the war, they would spend over 33 million pesos and suffer over 10,000 casualties (much of it due to yellow fever). Santana made unsuccessful efforts to force his way into Cibao and there was much yellow fever and malaria among his troops. In March 1864, he pointedly disobeyed orders to concentrate his forces around Santo Domingo and was rebuked and relieved of his command by Governor-General José de la Gándara, who ordered Santana to Cuba in order to face a court-martial. However, Santana died suddenly before this happened.

La Gándara attempted to broker a cease-fire with the rebels. He and Salcedo agreed to discuss peace terms, but in the middle of negotiations, Salcedo was overthrown and assassinated by the disaffected group of Restoration commanders led by Gaspar Polanco. Polanco was concerned that Salcedo was taking negligent actions against the Spanish authorities, made numerous costly military mistakes and was planning to recall former pro-annexation president Buenaventura Báez, whom the rebels hated as much as they hated the Spanish for his actions before Santana's July 1857 coup. Although Báez had initially opposed Spanish annexation, once it began he lived in Spain on a government subsidy and had the honorary rank of field marshal in the Spanish Army. It was not until near the end of the war that he returned to the Dominican Republic.

In Spain, the war was proving to be extremely unpopular. Combined with other political crises that were happening, it contributed to the downfall of Spanish Prime Minister Leopoldo O'Donnell in 1866. Spain's Minister of War ordered the cessation of military operations on the island while new Prime Minister Ramón María Narváez brought the issue before the Cortes Generales.

Polanco's reign was short-lived. After an ill-fated attack on the Spanish position in Monte Cristi and efforts to establish a tobacco monopoly on behalf of his friends, he himself was overthrown by a movement supported by his own brother General Juan Antonio Polanco, Pedro Antonio Pimentel and Benito Moncion who appointed Benigno Filomeno de Rojas as president and Gregorio Luperón as vice-president in January 1865. Given the respite in fighting, the provisional junta organized a new constitution, and when that was adopted, General Pedro Antonio Pimentel became the new president effective March 25, 1865.

By this time, the outcome of the American Civil War was no longer in serious doubt. On the other side of the Atlantic, the Cortes now had to consider the probability of eventual U.S. intervention and decided it did not want to fund a war for a territory it did not really need. On March 3, 1865, Queen Isabella II signed the annulment of the annexation. By July 15, there were no more Spanish troops left on the island.

Aftermath 

Although many Dominican cities were destroyed and agriculture across the country (apart from tobacco) halted during the war years, the War of Restoration brought a new level of national pride to the Dominican Republic. The Dominican victory also showed nationalists in Cuba and Puerto Rico that Spain could be defeated. On the other hand, in local politics, leadership during the war was concentrated in the hands of a few regional caudillos, or strongmen, who could command the loyalty of the regions and who were more intent on bettering themselves and their followers than the nation as a whole. This system of political power persisted until the late 20th century.

Dominican politics remained unstable for the next several years. Pimentel was president for only five months before he was replaced by José María Cabral. Cabral in turn was ousted by Buenaventura Báez in December 1865, but retook the presidency in May 1866. His negotiations with the United States about the possible sale of land around Samaná Bay proved to be so unpopular that Báez was able to regain the presidency once more in 1868.

In intra-island relations, the war marked a new level of cooperation between Haiti and the Dominican Republic. Until now, Haiti had considered the island of Hispaniola to be "indivisible" and had unsuccessfully attempted to conquer the eastern half several times before. The war forced Haiti to realize that this goal was essentially unattainable, and was instead replaced by years of border disputes between the two countries.

August 16 is commemorated a national holiday in the Dominican Republic, as well as the day the Dominican president is sworn into office every four years.

See also
Dominican War of Independence

References

Military history of the Caribbean
Anti-imperialism in North America
Rebellions against the Spanish Empire
Spanish American wars of independence
Latin American wars of independence
History of the Dominican Republic
19th-century rebellions
19th-century revolutions
19th century in the Caribbean
19th century in the Dominican Republic
Conflicts in 1863
Conflicts in 1864
Conflicts in 1865
Wars involving the Dominican Republic
Wars involving Spain
1860s in the Caribbean
1860s in the Dominican Republic
1863 in the Dominican Republic
1864 in the Dominican Republic
1865 in the Dominican Republic
Restorations (politics)